Acrotaeniostola sexvittata is a species of tephritid or fruit flies in the genus Acrotaeniostola of the family Tephritidae.

Distribution
Korea, Japan, Taiwan.

References

Tephritinae
Insects described in 1914
Diptera of Asia